Sir Albert William Woods  (16 April 18167 January 1904) was an English officer of arms, who served as Garter Principal King of Arms from 1869 to 1904. The Woods family has a strong tradition of service at the College of Arms. Albert Woods was the son of Sir William Woods, Garter King of Arms from 1838 until his death in 1842. Likewise, the grandson of Albert Woods was Sir Gerald Woods Wollaston, who also rose to the rank of Garter King of Arms and served there from 1930 until 1944.

Heraldic career
Woods' first heraldic appointment came in 1837 when he served as Fitzalan Pursuivant of Arms Extraordinary at the coronation of Queen Victoria. In 1838 Woods became a member of the chapter of the College of Arms when he was appointed Portcullis Pursuivant of Arms in Ordinary. After a short appointment as Norfolk Herald of Arms Extraordinary, Woods was promoted to the office of Lancaster Herald of Arms in Ordinary in 1841. He held this position until 1869, when he was appointed Garter Principal King of Arms, a position he held until his death 35 years later.

From 1866, Woods was registrar of the College of Arms. At his appointment as Garter Principal King of Arms, he was also named the King of Arms of the Order of St Michael and St George. In 1878, he was made registrar of the Order of the Star of India and the Order of the Indian Empire. He officiated at the coronations both of Queen Victoria and of Edward VII.

Woods's eye for heraldic design has been deprecated by some heraldists. In his Complete Guide to Heraldry, Arthur Fox-Davies refers to his designs as "wretched", "unsuitable" and "abortions". He is particularly critical of the crests granted by Woods, which frequently incorporated tree trunks, either in front of the crest or underneath it, a practice Davies considered unheraldic.

"Garter's Ordinaries"
Woods was responsible for the compilation of the important unpublished ordinary of arms (a systematic register of coats of arms) known as "Garter's Ordinaries". He began work on it in 1842 and continued until his death in 1904. By that date the ordinary comprised two series, one of five and the other of six volumes, plus indexes. Following his death it was donated to the College of Arms by his grandson, Gerald Woods Wollaston: since then, subsequent Garter Kings of Arms have added to it and kept it up to date by including within it new grants of arms. It remains in use: Sir Anthony Wagner has described it as "an indispensable tool at the College".

Honours and appointments
1837 - Fitzalan Pursuivant of Arms Extraordinary
1838 - Portcullis Pursuivant of Arms in Ordinary
1841 - Norfolk Herald of Arms Extraordinary
1841 - Lancaster Herald of Arms in Ordinary
1869 - Knight Bachelor
1869 - Garter Principal King of Arms
1897 - Knight Commander of the Order of the Bath
1899 - Knight Commander of the Order of St Michael and St George
1903 - Knight Grand Cross of the Royal Victorian Order

Arms

See also
Heraldry
Pursuivant
Herald

References

External links
The College of Arms
CUHAGS Officer of Arms Index
DNB entry

1816 births
1904 deaths
English officers of arms
Knights Commander of the Order of St Michael and St George
Knights Commander of the Order of the Bath
Knights Grand Cross of the Royal Victorian Order
Knights of Grace of the Order of St John
Knights Bachelor
Fellows of the Society of Antiquaries of London